Andrei Vasilevski may refer to:

Andrei Vasilevski (ice hockey, born 1966), Russian ice hockey goaltender
Andrei Vasilevskiy (born 1994), Russian ice hockey goaltender
Andrei Vasilevski (tennis) (born 1991), Belarusian tennis player